Elfsberg is a surname. Notable people with the surname include:

Claes Elfsberg (born 1948), Swedish television journalist
Joa Elfsberg (born 1979), Swedish ice hockey player

See also
Ellsberg

Swedish-language surnames